"Long Legged Girl (with the Short Dress On)" is a song first recorded by Elvis Presley as part of the soundtrack for his 1967 MGM motion picture Double Trouble.

Background
The song was written by J. Leslie McFarland and Winfield Scott and published by Elvis Presley Music, Inc.

Released in 1967 as a single, with "That's Someone You Never Forget" (from the 1962 album Pot Luck) as the B-side, it spent 6 weeks on the Billboard Hot 100, peaking at no. 63 on the week ending June 10. The single reached no. 24 in Canada, no. 36 in Australia on the Go-Set chart, and no. 49 in the UK.

Critical response 
Billboard reviewed the single in its May 6, 1967 issue. The magazine predicted "Long Legged Girl (with the Short Dress On)" to reach the top 60 of the Hot 100 chart and characterized it as "a strong rhythm entry with traces of his earlier hit sounds" such as "Blue Suede Shoes".

The 2014 book The Elvis Movies called "Long Legged Girl (with the Short Dress On)" "probably the best song in the movie" Double Trouble.

The 2013 book Elvis Music FAQ concluded: "Long Legged Girl (with the Short Dress On)" is tolerable faux hard rock. "The guitar is dirty, but the lick is humdrum, and Elvis sounds detached. It wasn't a good single choice, but it has a pulpy cheese thing going."

Charts

References 

1967 songs
1967 singles
Elvis Presley songs
RCA Records singles
Songs written for films
Songs written by John Leslie McFarland
Songs written by Winfield Scott (songwriter)